The Indian cricket team toured Pakistan from 28 September to 2 October 1997 to play three One Day Internationals as part of the Wills Challenge Series. The tournament was staged to commemorate the 50 years of Pakistan's independence. Pakistan won the series 2–1.

Squads

Pakistan announced a 14-member squad for the series on 25 September. Captain Ramiz Raja, Salim Malik and Mohammad Akram were dropped; pacer Waqar Younis was included in the squad along with batsmen Mohammad Wasim and Saleem Elahi. Saeed Anwar was appointed captain of the side and Moin Khan his deputy.

Match results

1st ODI

2nd ODI

3rd ODI

References

External links 
 Series home at ESPN Cricinfo archive
 

1997 in cricket
International cricket competitions from 1997–98 to 2000
Indian cricket seasons from 1970–71 to 1999–2000
Pakistani cricket seasons from 1970–71 to 1999–2000
1997–98